Tairō ("great elder") was a high-ranking official position in the Tokugawa shogunate government of Japan, roughly comparable to the office of prime minister. The tairō presided over the governing rōjū council in the event of an emergency. A tairō was nominated from among the fudai daimyōs, who worked closely with the Tokugawa traditionally. Generally, the office holder was the shogunate's chief policy maker, and provided Japan with a capable temporary leader in the absence of a shōgun, or in the event that the shōgun was incapacitated.

List of tairō

See also 
 The Five Tairō

Notes

References
 Cullen, Louis M. (2003). A History of Japan, 1582-1941: Internal and External Worlds. Cambridge: Cambridge University Press. ; ;   OCLC 442929163
 Sansom, George Bailey. (1963). A History of Japan: 1615-1867. Stanford: Stanford University Press. OCLC 36820228

 
Officials of the Tokugawa shogunate